The Ammon Underwood House is a historic house in East Columbia, Texas, U.S.. It was first built as a log house for Ammon Underwood in 1835. It became a boarding school in 1839, and his family home in 1839, where he lived with his wife Rachel J. Carson. The house was "moved three times before the 1940s." It has been listed on the National Register of Historic Places since June 24, 1976.

See also

National Register of Historic Places listings in Brazoria County, Texas
Recorded Texas Historic Landmarks in Brazoria County

References

External links

Houses on the National Register of Historic Places in Texas
Greek Revival houses in Texas
Houses completed in 1835
Houses in Brazoria County, Texas